Walt Reed (1917-2015) was an art historian and author of books on illustration.  Reed was the author of several works on illustration and illustrators including Harold von Schmidt, John Clymer, and Joseph Clement Coll.  In 1974, he founded the gallery Illustration House in Westport, Connecticut.  His book on Coll, The Magic Pen of Joseph Clement Coll, was published by Donald M. Grant, Publisher, Inc. in 1978.

References

American art historians
1917 births
2015 deaths